We Be the Echo is an American instrumental rock band from San Francisco. They play a blend of math rock, brutal prog, punk, jazz and heavy metal with dub influenced bass lines. The band's sound is based on melodic and rhythmically challenging short songs that often incorporate shred guitar. They formed in 2003 from the remnants of the Bay Area experimental band Bm Relocation Program.

The band members have also variously played (or continue to play) in other bands/projects including UK-based hardcore punk bands Voorhees and Break It Up, and San Francisco-based The John Francis, Desire Paths, Life Fire In Peopledom, The Mao, Drift Erratics, Bm Relocation Program and others.

Members
Graeme Nicholls - Guitar
Myke Stryker   - Bass 
Ilk Koskelo - Drums

Discography
Cubist Music EP (2004) - Chuckbeat Records
Dry Or Damp - I'm Still The Champ (2006) - Copper Press Magazine Compilation No. 27
Stanislaw Stories LP (2006) - Chuckbeat Records
All-Star Destroyers EP (2007/08) - Chuckbeat/Brutal Prog/Mandai
Masks LP (2009) - Chuckbeat/Brutal Prog
Return To Nations LP (2011) - Chuckbeat Records

See also
 List of math rock groups
 Experimental rock

Sources
Soundshock (UK) (Review)
Spinning Platters (SF) (Interview)
Grand Street News (NYC) (Live review)
San Fran Voice (SF) (Interview) - retrieved on October 27, 2008
News Review (Chico) (Article) - retrieved on October 27, 2008
The Owl (Review) - retrieved on October 27, 2008
30music.com (Canada) (Review) - retrieved October 31, 2008
Bandcamp Daily (Article) retrieved July 26, 2019

External links
Official Website
On youtube.com
Bandcamp

American instrumental musical groups
Indie rock musical groups from California
Math rock groups
Musical groups from San Francisco
Progressive rock musical groups from California
Musical groups established in 2003